Virtual Girl is a science fiction novel by Amy Thomson published in 1993 by Ace Books, about a robot illegally built with artificial intelligence. The author won the John W. Campbell Award for Best New Writer with the book.

References

External links 
 

1993 American novels
1993 science fiction novels
American science fiction novels
Novels by Amy Thomson
Ace Books books